This is a list of schools in the Los Angeles Unified School District.  The concept of zones is explained on the LAUSD website.

K–12 schools
Zoned schools
Elizabeth Learning Center (only K–8 is zoned) (Cudahy, opened 1927)
James A. Foshay Learning Center (only 6–12 is zoned; in order to attend Foshay LC for 9–12, a student has to have been enrolled as an 8th grader) (Los Angeles, opened 1924)
Robert F. Kennedy Community Schools (opened 2010)
Vaughn Next Century Learning Center (formerly Vaughn Street Elementary School)
Magnet/alternative schools
Banneker Special Education Center (Willowbrook)
Marlton School (Los Angeles, opened 1968) – for deaf and hearing-impaired students
Lake Balboa Magnet  (Los Angeles) – currently the only K–12 Magnet School in LAUSD.

4–12 schools

Zoned schools
 Robert F. Kennedy Community Schools (Central Los Angeles New Learning Center 1 Middle School/High School) (opened September 2010) (on the site of the Ambassador Hotel)

Magnet schools
Sherman Oaks Center for Enriched Studies

K–8 schools

Zoned schools
 Caroldale Learning Community (Carson)
 Ellen Ochoa Learning Center (Cudahy, opened 2004
 Hesby Oaks School (Los Angeles, reopened 2006)
 Pio Pico Span School (K–8)], (formerly Pio Pico Elementary School, Los Angeles, opened 1987 as a K–6 elementary school, expanded to K–8 in 1994–95) (When Central Region ES 13 [Carson-Gore Academy of Environmental Studies] opened in 2010, Pio Pico was reconfigured into a middle school )
 Porter Ranch Community School (Los Angeles, opened 2012)
 South Region Span K–8 1 (Los Angeles, opened 2011 )
 Sylmar Leadership Academy (Los Angeles, opened 2012)
 Utah Street Span School

Option schools
Academia Semillas del Pueblo (K–7, opened 2002)
Secondary schools

6–12 schools

Horace Mann UCLA Community School (originally Horace Mann Middle School) (opened 2019)
Girls Academic Leadership Academy (GALA) (opened 2016)
International Studies Learning Center (opened 2019)
Los Angeles Center for Enriched Studies
Maywood Center for Enriched Studies (Maywood, opened 2017)
Robert Fulton College Preparatory School (opened 2010)
Magnolia Public Schools, Los Angeles Area
Magnolia Science Academy-1 Reseda
Magnolia Science Academy-2 Valley
Magnolia Science Academy-3 Carson
Magnolia Science Academy-4 Venice
Magnolia Science Academy-5 Los Lobos (Grades 6–10)
Magnolia Science Academy-6 Palms (Grades 6–8, opened 2009)
Magnolia Science Academy-8 Bell (Grades 6–8)

7–12 schools
Zoned schools
 Eagle Rock High School (opened 1927)
 Rancho Dominguez Preparatory School (Long Beach) (opened 2011)

High schools (grades 9–12)

Zoned high schools

Nava College Preparatory Academy (Los Angeles, opened 2014) (Knights)
Dr. Maya Angelou Community High School (Los Angeles, opened 2011) (Wolfpack)
Arleta High School (opened 2006 ) (Mustangs)
Phineas Banning High School (Wilmington, opened 1926) (Pilots)
Bell High School (Bell, opened 1925) (Eagles)
Belmont High School (Los Angeles, opened 1923; became a 6–12 school (Sentinels)
Helen Bernstein High School (Hollywood, opened 2008) ) (Dragons)
Birmingham High School (Van Nuys, opened 1952; became a charter school in 2009) (Patriots)
Canoga Park High School (opened 1915) (Hunters) 
Carson High School (Carson, opened 1963) (Colts)
César Chávez High School (San Fernando, California), (opened 2011) ) (Eagles)
Chatsworth High School (opened 1963) (Chancellors)
Grover Cleveland High School (Los Angeles, opened 1959) (Cavaliers)
Miguel Contreras Learning Complex (Los Angeles, opened 2006) ) (The area around Contreras is zoned to Belmont High School.) (Cobras)
Crenshaw High School (Los Angeles, opened 1968) (Cougars)
Susan Miller Dorsey High School (Los Angeles, opened 1937)  (Dons/Donnas)
Mervyn M. Dymally High School (Los Angeles, opened 2012) (Challengers)
East Valley High School (North Hollywood, opened 2006) ) (Falcons)
El Camino Real Charter High School (Los Angeles, opened 1969; became a charter school in 2011) (Conquistadores)
Esteban Torres High School (East Los Angeles, opened 2010) (Toros)
Fairfax High School (Los Angeles, opened 1924) (Lions)
Benjamin Franklin High School (Highland Park, opened 1916) (Panthers)
Frida Kahlo High School (Los Angeles, opened 2005)
John C. Fremont High School (Los Angeles, opened 1924) (Pathfinders)
Gardena High School (Los Angeles, opened 1901) (Panthers)
James A. Garfield High School (East Los Angeles, opened 1925) (Bulldogs)
Granada Hills Charter High School (opened 1960; became a charter school in 2003) (Highlanders)
Ulysses S. Grant High School (Los Angeles, opened 1959) (Lancers)
Dr. Richard A. Vladovic Harbor Teacher Preparation Academy (Wilmington, opened 2002) (Monarchs) 
Hollywood High School (opened 1903) (Sheiks)
Alexander Hamilton High School (Los Angeles, opened 1931) (Yankees)
Augustus F. Hawkins High School (Los Angeles, opened 2012) (Hawks)
Huntington Park High School (Huntington Park, opened 1909) (Spartans)
Hilda Learning Solis Academy (Los Angeles,California, opened 2012)
Thomas Jefferson High School (Los Angeles, opened 1916) (Democrats)
Jordan High School (Los Angeles, opened 1923) (Bulldogs)
John F. Kennedy High School (Los Angeles, opened 1971) (Cougars)
Robert F. Kennedy Community Schools (Los Angeles, opened 2010) (K-12) (Bobcats)
Legacy High School Complex (South Gate, opened 2012) (Tigers)
Abraham Lincoln High School (Lincoln Heights, opened 1878) (Tigers)
Alain Leroy Locke College Preparatory Academy (Los Angeles, opened 1967) (Saints)
Los Angeles High School (opened 1873) (Romans)
Manual Arts High School (Los Angeles, opened 1910) (Toilers)
Linda Esperanza Marquez High School, (Huntington Park, opened 2011) (Gladiators)
John Marshall High School (Los Angeles, opened 1931) (Barristers)
Felicitas and Gonzalo Mendez High School (Boyle Heights, opened 2009) (Jaguars)
James Monroe High School (North Hills, opened 1958) (Vikings)
Narbonne High School (Harbor City, opened 1925) (Gauchos)
North Hollywood High School (opened 1927) (Huskies)
Northridge Academy High School (opened 2004) (Pumas)
Highly Gifted Magnet
Palisades Charter High School (Pacific Palisades, opened 1961) (Dolphins)
Panorama High School (Panorama City, opened 2006 ) (Pythons)
John H. Francis Polytechnic High School (Los Angeles; opened 1897, renamed 1935) (Parrots)
Ramón C. Cortines School of Visual and Performing Arts (Los Angeles, opened 2009)
Reseda Charter High School (opened 1955) (Regents)
Ramona High School
Diego Rivera Learning Complex (Los Angeles, opened 2011)  (Huskies)
Roosevelt High School (Los Angeles, opened 1922) (Teddy Bears, Rough Riders)
Edward R. Roybal Learning Center (Los Angeles, opened 2008)  (Titans)
San Fernando High School (Pacoima [Los Angeles], opened 1896) (Tigers)
San Pedro High School (opened 1898) (Pirates)
San Pedro High School Olguin Campus (opened 2012)
Santee Education Complex (Los Angeles, opened 2005 ) (Falcons)
Sonia M. Sotomayor Learning Academies (Los Angeles, opened 2011) (Wolves)
South East High School (South Gate, opened 2005 ) (Jaguars)
South Gate High School (South Gate, opened 1932) (Rams)
Sylmar High School (opened 1961) (Spartans) 
William Howard Taft Charter High School (Woodland Hills, opened 1960) (Toreadors)
University High School (Los Angeles, opened 1924) (Wildcats)
Valley Academy of Arts and Sciences (Granada Hills, opened 2011)  (Vipers)
Van Nuys High School (opened 1915) (Wolves)
Venice High School (opened 1911, current location 1925) (Gondoliers)
Verdugo Hills High School (Tujunga, opened 1937) (Dons)
Washington Preparatory High School (Westmont, opened 1927) (Generals)
West Adams Preparatory High School (Los Angeles, opened 2007) (Panthers)
Westchester Enriched Sciences Magnets (Los Angeles, opened 1948) (Comets)
Wilson High School (Los Angeles, opened 1969) (Mighty Mules)

Gallery of high schools

Continuation high schools

Jane Addams High School
Angel's Gate High School
Benjamin Franklin High School
Avalon High School
Boyle Heights High School
Central High School
Cheviot Hills High School
Del Rey High School
Douglas High School
East Valley Continuation High School
Eagle Tree Continuation High School
Earhart High School
Einstein High School
Ellington High School (Westmont)
Evergreen High School
Grey High School 
Highland Park High School
Hope High School
Independence High School
John R. Wooden High School
Leonis High School
Lewis High School
London High School
Metropolitan High School
Mission High School
Moneta High School
Monterey High School
Mt. Lukens High School
Newmark High School
Odyssey High School
Owensmouth High School
Patton High School
Phoenix High School
Pueblo de Los Angeles High School
Rodia High School
Rogers High School
San Antonio High School
Stoney Point High School
Thoreau High School
Truth High School
View Park Continuation High School
Walt Whitman High School
Young High School
Alternative high schools

Animo Locke Technology High School
Animo South Los Angeles (Westmont)
Ánimo Venice Charter High School
Francisco Bravo Medical Magnet High School
California Academy for LS
Camino Nuevo Charter Academy
Central City Value
College Ready Academy High School
Crenshaw Arts Technical
Daniel Pearl Magnet High School
De La Hoya Animo High School
Downtown Magnets High School
Discovery Charter Preparatory
East Los Angeles Renaissance Academy
Ramón C. Cortines High School for the Visual and Performing Arts, opened September 2009http://www.laschools.org/clahs9.pdf 
High Tech Los Angeles
King/Drew Magnet High School of Medicine and Science
Leap High School
Los Angeles College Prep Academy, opened 2005 
Maywood Academy High School (Maywood, opened 2006 )
 Felicitas and Gonzalo Mendez High School (formerly East Los Angeles New High School 1) (opened 2009 )
Middle College High School
Northridge Academy High School, opened 2004
Orthopaedic Hospital Medical Magnet High School
Renaissance Academy (Los Angeles)
Vaughn Next Century Learning Center
View Park Preparatory Accelerated High School
J.P. Widney High School
Port of Los Angeles High School 
New Designs Charter School

Middle schools (grades 6–8)

Zoned middle schools
John Adams Middle School (Los Angeles) (Patriots)
Dr.Julian Nava Learning Academy
Audubon Middle School (Los Angeles) (Eagles)
Hubert Howe Bancroft Middle School (Los Angeles) – established 1929, contains a Performing Arts Magnet and a STE[+a]M Magnet (Cougars)
Belvedere Middle School (East Los Angeles) (Olympians)
Berendo Middle School (Los Angeles) (Crusaders)
Dr. Mary McLeod Bethune Middle School (Los Angeles) (Mighty Mustangs)
Luther Burbank Middle School (Los Angeles) (Bears)
John Burroughs Middle School (Los Angeles) (Bears)
Richard E. Byrd Middle School (Los Angeles) (A new campus for Byrd is completed in 2008) (Penguins)
Andrew Carnegie Middle School (Carson) (Highlanders)
Central Los Angeles Area New Middle School 3 (opened 2009)
Central Region Middle School 7 (opened in 2011)
Dr. George Washington Carver Middle School (Los Angeles) (Cougars)
William Jefferson Clinton Middle School (Los Angeles) (opened 2006 ) (Eagles)
Johnnie L. Cochran Jr. Middle School (Los Angeles) – (formerly Mount Vernon Middle School) (Cougars)
Christopher Columbus Middle School (Los Angeles) (Explorers)
Glenn Hammond Curtiss Middle School (Carson) (Pilots)
Richard Henry Dana Middle School (Los Angeles) (Mariners)
Rudecinda Sepulveda Dodson Middle School (Los Angeles) (Dolphins)
Charles R. Drew Middle School (Los Angeles) (Cougars)
Thomas A. Edison Middle School (Los Angeles) (Eagles)
El Sereno Middle School (Los Angeles) (Jaguars)
Emerson Community Charter School (Los Angeles) (Panthers)
Alexander Fleming Middle School (Lomita) (Falcons)
Robert Frost Middle School (Los Angeles) (Timberwolves)
Henry T. Gage Middle School (Huntington Park) (Spartans)
Samuel Gompers Middle School (Los Angeles) (Bulldogs)
David Wark Griffith Middle School (East Los Angeles) (Bulldogs)
George Ellery Hale Middle School (Los Angeles) (Huskies, formerly Comets)
Patrick Henry Middle School (Los Angeles) (Patriots)
Hollenbeck Middle School (Los Angeles) (Junior Riders)
Oliver Wendell Holmes International Middle School (Los Angeles) (Eagles)
Washington Irving STEAM Magnet School (Los Angeles)
Young Oak Kim Academy (Los Angeles) (opened 2009)
Thomas Starr King Middle School (Los Angeles) (Lions)
Ernest Lawrence Middle School (Los Angeles) (Lions)
Joseph Le Conte Middle School (Los Angeles) (Eagles)
John H. Liechty Middle School (Los Angeles) (opened 2007) (Sharks)
Los Angeles Academy Middle School (Los Angeles) (Lions)
Charles Maclay Middle School (Los Angeles) (Proud Lions)
James Madison Middle School (Los Angeles) (Bulldogs)
Marina del Rey Middle School (Los Angeles)
Mark Twain Middle School (Los Angeles)
Edwin Markham Middle School (Los Angeles) (Eagles)
Robert A. Millikan Middle School (Los Angeles) (Turtles)
Mount Gleason Middle School (Los Angeles) (Mustangs)
John Muir Middle School (Los Angeles) (Cougars)
William Mulholland Middle School (Los Angeles) (Cascaders)
Florence Nightingale Middle School (Los Angeles) (Nighthawks)
Chester W. Nimitz Middle School (Huntington Park) (Seahawks)
Alfred Bernhard Nobel Charter Middle School (Los Angeles) (Nighthawks)
Northridge Middle School (Los Angeles) (Knights)
Olive Vista Middle School (Los Angeles) (Pandas)
Pacoima Middle School (Los Angeles) (Pumas)
Palms Middle School (Los Angeles) (Palms)
Robert E. Peary Middle School (Los Angeles) (Huskies)
George K. Porter Middle School (Los Angeles) (Trojans)
Gaspar De Portola Middle School (Los Angeles)
Walter Reed Middle School (Los Angeles) (Wolves)
Paul Revere Charter Middle School (Los Angeles) (Riders)
Roy Romer Middle School (Los Angeles) (opened 2008) (Rams)
San Fernando Middle School (San Fernando) (Falcons)
Sepulveda Middle School (Los Angeles) (Conquistadors)
Southeast Middle School] (South Gate, opened 2004) (Eagles)
South Gate Middle School (South Gate, opened 1941) (Vikings)
South Region Middle School #2 (Bell, opened 2010)
South Region Middle School #6 (opened 2010)
Robert Louis Stevenson Middle School (Los Angeles) (Pirates)
Sun Valley Magnet School (Los Angeles) (Pioneers)
John A. Sutter Middle School (Los Angeles) (Miners)
Van Nuys Middle School (Los Angeles) (Mustangs)
Virgil Middle School (Los Angeles) (Tigers)
Vista Middle School (Los Angeles) (opened 2004) (Cowboys)
Daniel Webster Middle School (Los Angeles) (Owls)
Daniel Webster STEAM Magnet Middle School (Los Angeles) (Owls)
Stephen M. White Middle School (Carson) (Knights)
Walnut Park Middle School (Walnut Park) (opened 2012) (Huskies)
Wilmington Middle School STEAM Magnet (Los Angeles) (Jaguars)
Woodland Hills Academy (Los Angeles) (Wolves)
Orville Wright Middle School STEAM Magnet (Los Angeles)
James Madison Middle School (Los Angeles)
New Designs Charter School (Los Angeles) (Cardinals)

Alternative middle schools Magnet only
North Valley Charter Academy

Elementary schools

Zoned elementary schools

Numbers
1st Street Elementary School
2nd Street Elementary School
3rd Street Elementary School
4th Street Elementary School (East Los Angeles)
6th Avenue Elementary School 
7th Street Elementary School
9th Street Elementary School
10th Street Elementary School (Eagles)
15th Street Elementary School
20th Street Elementary School (Dolphins)
24th Street Elementary School 
28th Street Elementary School
42nd Street Elementary School
49th Street Elementary School (Tigers)
52nd Street Elementary School
54th Street Elementary School
59th Street Elementary School
61st Street Elementary School
66th Street Elementary School
68th Street Elementary School
74th Street Elementary School
75th Street Elementary School
92nd Street Elementary School
93rd Street Elementary School
95th Street Elementary School (Westmont)
96th Street Elementary School
99th Street Elementary School
107th Street Elementary School
109th Street Elementary School
112th Street Elementary School
116th Street Elementary School
118th Street Elementary School
122nd Street Elementary School (Willowbrook)
135th Street Elementary School
153rd Street Elementary School
156th Street Elementary School
186th Street Elementary School
232nd Place Elementary School

A
Albion Street Elementary School
Aldama Elementary School
Alexandria Avenue Elementary School
Allesandro Elementary School
Alta California Elementary School
Alta Loma Elementary School
Amanecer Primary Center (K–2) (opened 2005 , East Los Angeles)
Ambler Avenue Elementary School
Amestoy Elementary School
Anatola Avenue Elementary School
Andasol Avenue Elementary School
Angeles Mesa Elementary School
Ann Street Elementary School (5th Oldest Elementary School in LAUSD, opened 1884.)
Annalee Avenue Elementary School
Annandale Elementary School
Anton, William R. Elementary School (Note: Hammel Street Elementary Demolished after school Moved to Anton.)
Apperson Street Elementary School
Aragon Avenue Elementary School
Arlington Heights Elementary School
Arminta Street Elementary School
Arroyo Seco Museum Science Magnet
Ascot Avenue Elementary School
Atwater Avenue Elementary School
Aurora Elementary School (opened 2006 )
Avalon Gardens Elementary School (Willowbrook)

B
Judith F. Baca Arts Academy (opened 2010)
Danny J. Bakewell Sr. Primary Center (Kindergarten, opened 2005 )
Balboa Gifted/High Ability Magnet Elementary (1–5)
Baldwin Hills Elementary School
Bandini Street Elementary School
Charles W. Barrett Elementary School (formerly 98th Street School)
Barton Hill Elementary School
Bassett Street Elementary School
Beachy Avenue Elementary School
Beckford Charter for Enriched Studies
Beethoven Street Elementary School
Bellevue Primary Center (K–1)
Bellingham Elementary School (opened 2004 )
Belvedere Elementary School
Bertrand Avenue Elementary School
Frances Blend Elementary School (opened 1926, merged with Van Ness Avenue Elementary School in 2013)
Blythe Street Elementary School
Bonita Street Elementary School
Braddock Drive Elementary School
Tom Bradley Global Awareness Magnet (The school also takes "zoned" students & also formerly known as Dublin Elementary)
Brainard Elementary School
Breed Street Elementary School (2nd Oldest Elementary School in LAUSD, opened 1881.)
Brentwood Elementary Science Magnet (only kindergarten is zoned – 1–5 are magnet students)
Bridge Street Elementary School
Birdielee V. Bright Elementary School (formerly 36th Street School)
Broad Avenue Elementary School
Broadacres Avenue Elementary School
Hillery T. Broadous Elementary School (formerly Filmore Street School)
Broadway Elementary School
Brockton Avenue Elementary School
Brooklyn Avenue Elementary School (East Los Angeles)
Bryson Avenue Elementary School
Buchanan Street Elementary School
Budlong Avenue Elementary School
Burbank Boulevard Elementary School
Burton Street Elementary School
Bushnell Way Elementary School

C

Cabrillo Avenue Elementary School
Cabrillo Avenue STEAM Magnet Elementary School
Cahuenga Elementary School
Calabash Charter Academy
Calahan Community Charter School
Calvert Charter for Enriched Studies
Camellia Avenue Elementary School
Canfield Avenue Elementary School
Canoga Park Elementary School
Cantara Street Elementary School
Canterbury Avenue Elementary School
Canyon Charter Elementary School
Capistrano Avenue Elementary School
Andres & Maria Cardenas Elementary School (opened 2010)
Carmen Lomas Garza Primary Center(k-2)
Caroldade Learning Community School
Carpenter Community Charter School (formerly Carpenter Avenue Elementary School)
Carson Street Elementary School
Carson-Gore Academy of Environmental Studies (opened 2010)
Carthay Center Elementary School (beginning in Fall 2014, Carthay ES becomes Carthay Elementary of Environmental Studies Magnet)
Castelar Street Elementary School (4th oldest elementary school in LAUSD located in Chinatown, opened 1882.)
Castle Heights Elementary School
Castlebay Lane Elementary School 
Catskill Avenue Elementary School
Century Park Elementary School
Chandler Learning Academy 
Chapman Elementary School 
Charnock Road Elementary School
Chase Street Elementary School
Chatsworth Park Elementary School
Cesar Chavez Elementary School (opened 2005)}
Cheremoya Avenue Elementary School
Chime Institute Schwarzenegger Community School (located at the former Collier Street School.)
Cienega Elementary School
Cimmaron Avenue Elementary School
City Terrace Elementary School (East Los Angeles)
Clifford Street Math & Technology Magnet 
Clover Avenue Elementary School
Coeur d'Alene Avenue Elementary School
Cohasset Street Elementary School
Coldwater Canyon Elementary School
Colfax Charter Elementary School
Coliseum Street Elementary School
Columbus Avenue Elementary School
Commonwealth Avenue Elementary School
Community Magnet Charter School
Compton Avenue Elementary School
Corona Avenue Elementary School
Sara Coughlin Elementary School (opened 2005 )
Cowan Avenue Elementary School
Crescent Heights Boulevard Elementary Language Arts and Social Justice Magnet 
Crestwood Street Elementary School

D

Dahila Heights Elementary School 
Danube Avenue Elementary School
Darby Avenue Charter School
Dayton Heights Elementary School
George De La Torre Elementary School (opened 2006)
Dearborn Elementary Charter School
Del Amo Elementary School
Frank Del Olmo Elementary School (opened 2006 )
Delevan Drive Elementary School
Christopher Dena Elementary School (formerly Dacotah Street School)
Denker Avenue Elementary School
Dixie Canyon Community Charter School
Dolores Street Elementary School
Dominguez Elementary School
Dorris Place Elementary School
Dr. Sammy Lee Medical/Health Science Magnet Elementary School
Dyer Street Elementary School

E

Eagle Rock Elementary School
Eastman Avenue Elementary School (East Los Angeles)
El Dorado Avenue Elementary School
El Oro Way Charter for Enriched Studies
El Sereno Elementary School
Elysian Heights Arts Magnet (Formerly Elysian Heights Elementary School)
Emelita Academy Charter School
Enadia Technology Enriched Charter School (Reopened in 2008 )
Encino Charter Elementary School
Erwin Elementary School
Jaime Escalante Elementary School (opened 2010)
Martha Escutia Primary Center (opened 2005)
Eshelman Avenue Elementary School
Esperanza Elementary School
Estrella Elementary School (opened 2010)
Euclid Avenue Elementary School
Evergreen Avenue Elementary School

F

Fair Avenue Elementary School – Established just after World War II (1946) as an "Overflow" school from Victory Boulevard School in North Hollywood – bungalows were moved from Victory Boulevard School to Fair Avenue (near) Tunjunga Blvd in North Hollywood in an empty farm lot.
Fairburn Avenue Elementary School
Farmdale Elementary School
Fenton Avenue Elementary School (charter school)
Fenton Avenue Primary Center (opened 2013)
Fernangeles Elementary School
Figueroa Street Elementary School
Fishburn Avenue Elementary School (Maywood)
Fletcher Drive Elementary School
Florence Avenue Elementary School
Lovelia P. Flournoy Elementary School (formerly 111th Street School)
Ford Boulevard Elementary School (East Los Angeles)
Franklin Avenue Elementary School
Fries Avenue Elementary School
Fullbright Avenue Elementary School

G

Garden Grove Elementary School
Gardena Elementary School
Gardner Street Elementary School
Garvanza Elementary School
Gates Street Elementary School
Gault Street Elementary School
Germain Academy for Academic Achievement
Glassell Park Elementary School
Gledhill Street Elementary School
Glen Alta Elementary School
Glenfeliz Boulevard Elementary School
Glenwood Elementary School
Graham Elementary School
Granada Community Charter School
Grand View Boulevard Elementary School 
Grant Elementary School
Grape Street Elementary School
Gratts Learning Academy for Young Scholars
Gridley Street Elementary School
Griffin Avenue Elementary School (3rd oldest elementary school in LAUSD, opened 1882.)
Florence Griffith-Joyner Elementary School
Gulf Avenue Elementary School

H
Haddon Avenue Elementary School
Halldale Elementary School
Hamlin Charter Academy 
Hancock Park Elementary School
Harbor City Elementary School
Harding Street Elementary School
Harmony Elementary School (opened 2004)
Harrison Elementary School (East Los Angeles)
Hart Street Elementary School
Harvard Elementary School (opened 2005)
Haskell Elementary STEAM Magnet
Hawaiian Avenue Elementary School
Haynes Charter for Enriched Studies 
Hazeltine Avenue Elementary School
Heliotrope Avenue Elementary School
Herrick Avenue Elementary School
Hillcrest Drive Elementary School
Hillside Elementary School
Hobart Boulevard Elementary School
Hollywood Primary Center (K–2) (opened 2005)
Holmes Avenue Elementary School
Hooper Avenue Elementary School (1–5)
Hooper Avenue Primary Center (Kindergarten only, completed 2005)
Hoover Street Elementary School
Hope Street Elementary School (opened 2005)
Hubbard Street Elementary School (opened , formerly Sylmar Chicken Ranch)
Dolores Huerta Elementary School (opened 2010)
Teresa Hughes Elementary School (Huntington Park)
Humphreys Avenue Elementary School (East Los Angeles)
Huntinghton Drive Elementary School
Huntington Park Elementary School (opened 2006)

I
Independence Elementary School
Ivanhoe Elementary School

J
Quincy Jones Elementary School 
Dr. James Edward Jones Primary Center (opened in 2008 )
Justice Street Academy Charter School
Jose Castellanos Elementary School

K
Kenter Canyon Charter Elementary School
Kentwood Elementary School 
Kester Avenue Elementary School
Charles H. Kim Elementary School (opened Fall 2006 )
Martin Luther King Jr. Elementary School (formerly Santa Barbara Avenue School)
Kingsley Elementary School (opened 2005 )
Kittridge Street Elementary School
Knollwood Preparatory Academy
Dr. Owen Lloyd Knox Elementary School
Julie Korenstein Elementary School (opened 2010)

L

La Salle Avenue Elementary School 
Lafayette Park Primary Center
Lake Street Primary School
Robert Hill Lane Elementary School 
Lanai Road Elementary School
Langdon Avenue Elementary School
Lankershim Elementary School
Lassen Elementary School 
Latona Avenue Elementary School
Laurel Elementary School
Gerald A. Lawson Academy A/M/S Elementary School
Leapwood Avenue Elementary School
Dr. Sammy Lee Elementary M/HS Magnet (opened 2013)
Leland Street Elementary School
Lemay Street Elementary School 
Lexington Avenue Primary Center (K–2) (opened 2006 )
Liberty Boulevard Elementary School
Liggett Street Elementary School
Lillian Elementary School
Limerick Avenue Elementary School (opened 1957, Re-opened 1980)
Ricardo Lizarraga Elementary School (opened 2005 )
Lockhurst Drive Charter Elementary School 
Lockwood Elementary School
Logan Street Elementary School
Loren Miller Elementary School
Loma Vista Elementary School (Maywood, opened 1926)
Lomita Elementary M/S/T Magnet 
Lorena Street Elementary School
Loreto Elementary School
Lorne Street Elementary School 
Los Angeles Elementary School 
Los Feliz Elementary School 
Loyola Village Elementary Fine/Performing Arts Magnet
Lucille Roybal-Allard Elementary School (opened 2012)

M
MacArthur Park Elementary Visual & Performing Arts
John W. Mack Elementary School (opened 2005 )
Madison Elementary School (opened 2005)
Magnolia Avenue Elementary School 
Main Street Elementary School
Maple Primary Center (K–1) (opened 2004 )
Malabar Street Elementary School
Manchester Avenue Elementary School
Manhattan Place Elementary School 
Mar Vista Elementary School
Marianna Avenue Elementary School
Mariposa-Nabi Primary Center (K–2) (opened 2005 )
Marquez Charter School (K–5)
Marvin Elementary School
Mayall Street Academy of Arts/Technology Magnet
Mayberry Street Elementary School (K–5) 
Maywood Elementary School (Maywood, opened 2005 )
Mckinley Avenue Elementary School
Melrose Avenue Elementary Math/Science/Technology Magnet
Melvin Avenue Elementary School
Menlo Elementary School
Meyler Street Elementary School
Micheltorena Elementary School (K – 5)
Middleton Elementary School] (1 – 6)
Middleton Primary Center (Kindergarten) (opened 2005 )
Miles Avenue Elementary School
Loren Miller Elementary School
Miramonte Elementary School
John B. Monlux Elementary School
Montague Charter Academy
Montara Avenue Elementary School 
Monte Vista Elementary School
Dr. Lawrence H. Moore Math/Science/Technology Academy (opened 2012)
Morningside Elementary School
Stanley Mosk Elementary School (opened 2010)
Mount Washington Elementary School
Mountain View Elementary School
Multnomah Street Elementary School
Murchinson Street Elementary School

N
Napa Street Elementary School
Nestle Avenue Charter School
Nevada Avenue Elementary School
Nevin Avenue Elementary School
Newcastle Elementary School
Noble Avenue Elementary School
Normandie Avenue Elementary School
Normont Elementary School
Norwood Street Elementary School
Nueva Vista Elementary School (Bell, opened 1991)

none

P
Pacific Boulevard School (opened 2005 )
Pacoima Charter Elementary School
Palisades Charter Elementary School (chartered 1993, renewed 2005)
Palms Elementary School
Panorama City Elementary School
Park Avenue Elementary School
Park Western Place Elementary School
Parmelee Avenue Elementary School
Parthenia Street Elementary School
Paseo del Rey Elementary Natural Science Magnet 
Pinewood Avenue Elementary School
Plainview Academic Charter Academy 
Betty Plasencia Elementary School (formerly, Cortez Street School)
Playa Del Rey Elementary School
Playa Vista Elementary School (opened 2012)
Plummer Elementary School
Point Fermin Marine Science Magnet
Leo Politi Elementary School
Pomelo Community Charter School
President Avenue Elementary School
Primary Academy for Success School
Purche Avenue Elementary School

Q
Queen Anne Place Elementary School

R
Ramona Elementary School
Ranchito Avenue Elementary School
Raymond Avenue Elementary School
Reseda Elementary School
Richland Avenue Elementary School
Richard Riordan Primary Center
Rio Vista Elementary School
Ritter Elementary School
Riverside Drive Charter School
Rockdale Visual & Performing Arts Magnet
Rosa Parks Learning Center (opened 2006 )
Roscoe Elementary School
Roscomare Road Elementary School
Rosemont Avenue Elementary School
Rosewood Avenue Elementary School
Rowan Avenue Elementary School
Russell Elementary School

S

Sally Ride Elementary: A Smart Academy (opened 2012)
San Antonio Elementary School
San Fernando Elementary School
San Gabriel Avenue Elementary School
San Jose Street Elementary School
San Miguel Elementary School
San Pascual Avenue Elementary STEAM
San Pedro Street Elementary School (oldest ELEMENTARY School in LAUSD, opened 1866)
Santa Monica Boulevard Community Charter School
Saticoy Elementary School
Saturn Street Elementary School 
Selma Avenue Elementary School (closed permanently on June 11, 2021. The school opened in 1910)
Maurice Sendak Elementary School (opened 2005 )
Serrania Avenue Charter for Enriched Studies
Sharp Avenue Elementary School
Shenandoah Street Elementary School
Sheridan Street Elementary School
Sherman Oaks Elementary Charter School
Shirley Avenue Elementary School
Short Avenue Elementary School
Sierra Park Elementary School
Sierra Vista Elementary School
Solano Avenue Elementary School
Soto Street Elementary School
South Park Elementary School
South Shores Elementary Performing Arts Magnet
Stagg Street Elementary School
Stanford Elementary School (1-5)
Stanford Primary Center (Kindergarten, opened 2004 )
State Street Elementary School
Nora Sterry Elementary School 
Stonehurst Elementary School (Sun Valley)
Stoner Avenue Elementary School (Los Angeles)
Strathern Street Elementary School
Sunland Elementary School
Sunny Brae Elementary School
Sunrise Elementary School 
Superior Street Elementary School
Sylmar Elementary School
Sylvan Park Elementary School

T
Taper Avenue Elementary School
Tarzana Elementary School
Telfair Avenue Elementary School
Toland Way Elementary School
Toluca Lake Elementary School
Topanga Elementary Charter School (unincorporated Los Angeles County)
Topeka Avenue Charter for Advanced Studies 
Towne Avenue Elementary School
Trinity Street Elementary School
Tulsa Street Elementary School
Tweedy Elementary School (opened 2004 )

U
Union Avenue Elementary School

V
Valerio Street Elementary School
Valley View Elementary School
Van Deene Avenue Elementary School
Van Gogh Charter School
Van Ness Avenue Elementary School
Van Nuys Elementary School
Vanalden Avenue Elementary School
Vena Avenue Elementary School
Vermont Avenue Elementary School
Vernon City Elementary School (Vernon City)
Victoria Avenue Elementary School
Victory Boulevard Elementary School
Vine Street Elementary School
Vinedale Elementary School
Vintage Math/Science/Technology Magnet School (only kindergarten is zoned – Grades 1-5 are completely magnet)
Virginia Road Elementary School
Vista Del Valle Dual Language Academy (opened 2010)

W
Walnut Park Elementary School

Wadsworth Avenue Elementary School
Walgrove Avenue Elementary School
Walnut Park Elementary School
Warner Avenue Elementary School (Los Angeles)
Washington Primary Center (K–1) (opened 2005 )
Lenicia B. Weemes Elementary School (formerly 37th Street School)
Weigand Avenue Elementary School
Welby Way Charter Elementary and Gifted-High Ability Magnet
West Athens Elementary School
West Hollywood Elementary School
West Vernon Avenue Elementary School
Western Avenue Elementary School
Westminster Avenue Elementary Math/Technology/Environmental Studies Magnet
Westport Heights Elementary School
Westwood Charter Elementary School (Los Angeles)
Charles White Elementary School (opened 2004 )
White Point Elementary School
Wilbur Charter for Enriched Academics
Willow Elementary School (opened 2012)
Wilmington Park Elementary School
Wilshire Crest Elementary School
Wilshire Park Elementary School (opened 2006 )
Wilton Place Elementary School
Windsor Hills Elementary Math/Science Aerospace Magnet 
Winnetka Avenue Elementary School
Wisdom Elementary School (opened 2010)
Wonderland Avenue Elementary School
Woodcrest Elementary School
Woodlake Elementary Community Charter School
Woodland Hills Elementary Charter for Enriched Studies 
Woodlawn Avenue Elementary School

Y
Yorkdale Elementary School
Young Empowered Scholars Academy (also known as YES Academy) (formerly Hyde Park Elementary School)
Young Oak Kim Academy

Charter Elementary Schools
Para Los Ninos Gratts Primary Center
Aspire Public Schools
Aspire Firestone Academy
Aspire Gateway Academy
Aspire Inskeep Academy
Aspire Junior Collegiate Academy
Aspire Antonio Maria Lugo Academy
Aspire Slauson Acadeny 
Aspire Tate, Juanita Academy
Aspire Titan Academy
Magnolia Public Schools
Magnolia Science Academy 7-Northridge (previously Van Nuys, Grades K–5)

Optional elementary schools
32nd USC Performing Arts
Arroyo Seco Museum Science Magnet
Balboa Gifted/High Ability Magnet Elementary School
 Carthay Environmental Studies Magnet (began in Fall 2014)
N.E.W. Canoga Park Elementary School (opened 2006)
San Jose Highly Gifted Magnet Elementary

Early education centers
 Central Region EEC 1 (opened in 2010 )
 Central Region Gratts EEC (opened in 2009 )
 Valley Region EEC 1 (opened in 2010 )

To be opened
 Central Region EEC 2 (to be opened – renovation of classrooms at Humphreys ES )
 Central Region EEC 3 (to be opened – renovation of classrooms at Utah ES )
 Central Region Glassell Park EEC (to be opened )

Former schools
98th Street School – located at 5431 W 98th Street, Westchester, California. School Reopened in the 2000s as Bright Star Secondary Charter Academy.
Airport Junior High School (closed and razed in 1975) – located at 9000 Airport Boulevard, Westchester, California.
Anchorage Street School – located at 104 E Anchorage Street, Marina Del Rey, California. Merged to Westside Global Awareness Magnet.
Central Junior High School – located on the former site of Fort Moore on Hill Street in Downtown, Los Angeles the school closed in 1946 to make way for a complex, and then demolished in 2005 to make way for Ramon C. Cortines School of Visual & Performing Arts
Henry Clay Middle School – located at 12226 S Western Avenue. This school is now home to Animo Western Charter Middle School
Collins Street Elementary School (closed by the end of 2001–2002 school year) – located at 5717 Rudnick Avenue, Woodland Hills, California. This school was demolished in 2018.
Collier Street School (1963-1988) – located at 19722 Collier Street, Woodland Hills, California. This school reopened in 1990 as CHIME Institute's Schwarzenegger Community School.
Custer Avenue School – located at Central Los Angeles. It was covered with freeway and now home to Downtown Magnets High School.
Devonshire School – located at 10045 Jumilla Avenue, Chatsworth, California. This school became home to our community school.
Francisco Street School – located near Francisco Street near Central Los Angeles. It is now home to the Park DTLA.
Hammel Street Elementary School (closed 2010) – located at 438 N Brannick Avenue. This school has moved to a new campus as William R. Anton Elementary School at 831 N Bonnie Beach Place near City Terrace While Hammel Street Elementary is demolished and was taken over by the new Esteban E. Torres High School in 2010.
Highlander Road Elementary School (1962-2004) – located at 23834 Highlander Road, Woodland Hills, California. This school has also been demolished in 2016, same year as Oso Avenue School, to make way for Hale VAPA Magnet.
Charles E. Hughes Middle School – located at 5607 Capistrano Avenue, Woodland Hills, California. This school is now home to Hughes Adult Learning Center.
Indiana Street Elementary School – Now Home to Ramona Community High School.
Lafayette Junior High School – located at 1240 Naomi Avenue. School closed in 1955 due to decreasing enrollment figures. Now used as a school district office.
McDonnell Avenue School – located at 4540 Michigan Ave, Los Angeles, California. Merged in 1970s as Alphonso B. Perez Career and Transition Center.
Oakdale Avenue School (1962-1976) Located at 6844 Oakdale Avenue, Winnetka, Los Angeles, California. The school was sold to reopen as AGBU Manoogian-Demirdjian School.
Osage elementary school - osage ave, westchester 90045
Oso Avenue Elementary School (closed 2003) – located at 5724 Oso Avenue, Woodland Hills, California. This school was demolished in 2016.
Palo Verde School – located in the Echo Park neighborhood. In the 1960s, the school and the remaining houses as well were all torn down to make way for the Dodger Stadium.
Louis Pasteur Junior High School – located at 5931 W. 18th Street, Los Angeles, California. This school reopened in 1977 as Los Angeles Center for Enriched Studies.
Platt Ranch Elementary School (1963-2003) – located at 5345 Wilhelmina Avenue, Woodland Hills, California. This former school has currently operated Class Acts Musical Theatre, but it was planning to reopen soon.
Prairie Street Elementary School – located on Prairie Street, Near California State University Northridge at Northridge, California. This school closed in 1993 and razed in 2004 to make way for parking lot and structure for CSUN.
Sequoia Junior High School – located at 18605 Erwin Street, Tarzana, California. This school reopened as Sherman Oaks Center for Enriched Studies.
Cesar T Elementary
Selma Avenue Elementary School – located at 6611 Selma Ave, Los Angeles, California. The school closed at the end of the 2020–2021 school year due to declining enrollment.
 Marlton School (Los Angeles, closed ends of 2021-2022 school year) – for deaf and hearing-impaired students due to declining enrollment.

References

External links
Find a school, LAUSD

 
Los Angeles Unified School District schools